Hiroaki Shimauchi (島内 宏明, born February 2, 1990) is a Japanese professional baseball outfielder for the Tohoku Rakuten Golden Eagles in Japan's Nippon Professional Baseball.

External links

NPB.com

1990 births
Living people
Baseball people from Ishikawa Prefecture
Meiji University alumni
Japanese baseball players
Nippon Professional Baseball outfielders
Tohoku Rakuten Golden Eagles players